Albert Mohr (2 July 1929 – 15 June 2005) was a West German cross-country skier who competed in the 1950s. He finished 65th in the 18 km event at the 1952 Winter Olympics in Oslo.

External links
18 km Olympic cross country results: 1948-52
 

Olympic cross-country skiers of Germany
Cross-country skiers at the 1952 Winter Olympics
German male cross-country skiers
1929 births
2005 deaths